WLVR-FM (91.3 MHz) is a non-commercial FM radio station in Bethlehem, Pennsylvania, and is owned by Lehigh University, and co-operated, with the university, by Lehigh Valley Public Telecommunications Corporation, also known as Lehigh Valley Public Media, licensee and operator of PBS affiliate WLVT-TV.  WLVR-FM is supported in part by listener donations.  With a focus on local news coverage, WLVR features Lehigh Valley Public Media’s Reporter Corps®, a team of multimedia journalists who cover the Lehigh Valley with in-depth local reporting. Overseeing the station is Christine Dempsey, Senior VP of Radio. Christine has over 30 years of experience in radio and is a current member of the Public Radio Program Directors Association’s board of directors.

WLVR-FM has an effective radiated power of 40 watts horizontal polarization and 200 watts vertical polarization.  The transmitter is on the campus of Lehigh University, off Research Drive.  Its studios are co-located with WLVT-TV on the SteelStacks Campus in south Bethlehem. WLVR-FM broadcasts using HD Radio technology.

Programming
WLVR-FM’s weekday program schedule includes some of the country’s most listened-to news programs from National Public Radio (NPR):  Morning Edition and All Things Considered.  In addition, Marketplace (from American Public Media), 1A, The World and BBC World Service are also part of the line-up.  Weekends feature shows such as Wait, Wait, Don't Tell Me, The Moth Radio Hour, Ask Me Another and You Bet Your Garden.

A digital subchannel, WLVR-HD-2, carries Lehigh University’s college radio station, programmed by students under the management of current WLVR-FM Chief Operator and Station Manager, Al Fritzinger Jr.  Shows feature active rock, alternative rock, hip hop, jazz, world music and other genres.

Both WLVR 91.3 and Lehigh University 91.3 WLVR-HD-2 can be streamed online at WLVR.org

Awards
WLVR-HD2 (Lehigh University) has won the Lehigh Valley Music Award for best College/Community Radio Station three consecutive years running. Popular DJ A.J. Fritz has also won the Lehigh Valley Music Award for Best College/Community Radio Personality six consecutive years running.

In 1972, the station's Program Director, Jim Cameron, received a Major Armstrong Award from Columbia University for his documentary "Old Friends". The award is named after the inventor of FM radio.

See also
Media in the Lehigh Valley

References

External links
 WLVR official website
 

LVR-FM
LVR-FM
Lehigh University
Radio stations established in 1948
News and talk radio stations in the United States
1948 establishments in Pennsylvania
NPR member stations